Victor Lloyd Clemett (December 10, 1899 – February 21, 2007) was one of the last surviving Canadian veterans of World War I. Clemett served for the Canadian Forestry Corps during World War I. Victor died in Toronto, Ontario, Canada at age 107.

References
 Death notice for Clemett at the CBC

1899 births
2007 deaths
Canadian centenarians
Men centenarians
Canadian military personnel of World War I